was a railway station on the Kesennuma Line in the city of  Kesennuma, Miyagi Prefecture, Japan, operated by East Japan Railway Company (JR East). The station was completely destroyed by the 2011 Tōhoku earthquake and tsunami and services have now been replaced by a provisional bus rapid transit line.

Lines
Koganezawa Station was served by the Kesennuma Line, and was located 54.6 kilometers from the terminus of the line at Maeyachi Station.

Station layout
Koganezawa Station had one side platform serving a single bi-directional track. The station was unattended.

History
Koganezawa Station opened on 11 February 1957. The station was absorbed into the JR East network upon the privatization of the Japan National Railways (JNR) on April 1, 1987. The station changed its name to its present name on 22 March 1997. The station was completely destroyed by 2011 Tōhoku earthquake and tsunami, and rail services have now been replaced by a bus rapid transit line.

Surrounding area
National Route 45
Ōya Beach
Ōya Post Office

See also
 List of railway stations in Japan

External links

 JR East Station information 
  video of a train trip from Rikuzen-Hashikami Station to Motoyoshi Station in 2009, passing through Ōya-Kaigan Station and Koganezawa Station without stopping at around 03:25 minutes and 06:30 minutes, respectively.  Satellite photos (e.g., in Google Maps) showed that large sections of track and railway bridges were severely affected or washed away by the 2011 tsunami.  Rikuzen-Hashikami Station was undamaged, Ōya-Kaigan Station was badly damaged or destroyed, and Koganezawa Station was damaged.

Railway stations in Miyagi Prefecture
Kesennuma Line
Railway stations in Japan opened in 1957
Railway stations closed in 2011
Kesennuma